Infinity the game (also known as Infinity: A Skirmish Game) is a tabletop miniature wargame with 28mm scale metal miniatures that simulates combat and special operations in a Science fiction environment created by Gutier Lusquiños Rodríguez, Alberto Abal, Fernando Liste and Carlos Torres of Corvus Belli. The games aesthetics are largely inspired by Manga, particularly the work of Masamune Shirow.

Each player controls a set of miniatures to represent soldiers on a tabletop battlefield, taking actions during play to achieve their set goals and prevent their opponent from achieving theirs, while also seeking to destroy their opponents soldiers.

Setting 
The game is set 175 years in the future, as such the aesthetics of Infinity can vary from run down shanty towns to hyper futuristic and pristine city precincts.

The Human race have discovered worm holes that allow interstellar travel into new galaxies; the nations of earth formed alliances with each other in order to join the space race to use these wormholes to colonize far-off planets.

It is these alliances along with newly discovered alien races that are competing for resources and technology that cause the friction and conflict that plays out on the table when playing Infinity the Game.

Gameplay 
This game uses unit and weapon profiles to determine the capabilities of each miniature on the tabletop, these profiles are then used alongside tape measures and twenty-sided dice to determine the outcomes of many of the actions and situations that arise during a game.

The Infinity game system uses a pool of orders which are used for individual model actions on the active players turn; these can be spent on a single model or spread across many.

A turn in infinity consists of the active player (the player whose turn it is) and reactive player (the player whose turn it isn't), the reactive player game mechanic allows the reactive player to make tactical decisions and actions based on their opponent's actions, though these will be in a more limited capacity to the active player. This feature allows both players to participate in every part of the game.

Face to face rolls are used during gameplay to signify that two or more models are directly affecting each other with their actions, the player who rolls more successful wins the encounter. Dice roll modifiers for weapon ranges exist that make targets easier to hit at a weapons optimum range and worse at close or longer ranges.

Hackers are also featured in Infinity and they allow players to immobilize, control or otherwise hamper of their adversaries robotic and power armored units.

Unlike most competitive tabletop miniature wargames, there are several things that a player keeps hidden from their opponent in Infinity, this includes models that do not deploy at the beginning of the game and also certain mission objectives. These are revealed when the models are deployed and when the mission objective has been achieved during the game.

Another important aspect of Infinity is the significance of terrain to provide cover for miniatures, which gives a bonus to their armor statistic and a negative to the opponents rolls to hit. Terrain is also necessary to hamper longer range weapons such as sniper rifles. The importance of terrain has led to Corvus Belli making partnerships with several third-party companies to create official terrain for Infinity.

The Infinity Tournament System 
A defining feature of Infinity the Game is the Infinity Tournament System, enables players to take part in tournaments with prize support from Corvus Belli using one of the official Infinity Tournament Packs. The results of each tournament are then uploaded onto the Infinity website where the results are used to rank the participants against players around the world.

Press 
In 2013 popular wargaming hobby site, Beasts Of War, ran an Infinity Week, featuring videos and articles on how to start playing and previews of new products, along with interviews with the creators of the game. In 2014, Beasts of War ran an Infinity 3rd Edition Week, promoting the upcoming new edition of the game. In 2016, Beasts of War ran an Infinity: Human Sphere N3 Week, featuring interviews with Carlos Llauger (Bostria) and demo games spotlighting updated rules.

Military.com published a spotlight article on Infinity explaining the game setting and gameplay features for their readership

References

External links 

  - Rules
  - Official Wiki

Miniature wargames
Wargames introduced in the 2000s